Baieroxylon is an extinct prehistoric genus of plants belonging to the Ginkgoaceae family during the Triassic, Jurassic, and Cretaceous Periods.

Fossil record
Palaeontological sites producing fossils of Baieroxylon species have been discovered in:
 Neuquén Province, Argentina — from the Huincul Formation and Rayoso Formation, of the Cretaceous period.
Franconia, Germany — from the Upper−Late Triassic epoch.
Rio Grande do Sul state, southern Brazil. — from the Santa Maria Formation in Paleorrota Geopark, of the Upper−Late Triassic epoch.
Chile.

References

Ginkgophyta
Prehistoric gymnosperm genera
Triassic plants
Jurassic plants
Cretaceous plants
Prehistoric plants of South America
Cretaceous life of South America
Late Triassic life of South America
Triassic Argentina
Fossils of Argentina
Triassic Brazil
Fossils of Brazil
Triassic first appearances
Cretaceous extinctions